Catholic TV (Pakistan) was established in 2009 and was the first Catholic television broadcast channel in Pakistan. The cable channel and other Christian broadcasts were banned by the government of Pakistan in 2016. Catholic TV Pakistan continues on via a website with videos.

It was started by Father Morris Jalal, who visited families and attended church functions in the Roman Catholic Archdiocese of Lahore carrying a video camera to document the community's life for the first Catholic TV channel in Pakistan. The founder and executive director of Catholic TV made the service available round-the-clock on a local cable channel.

Programming includes Christian films, documentaries on church activities, talk shows, interviews, holy songs, rosary recitation, Bible quiz competitions, and live Sunday Mass.

Catholic TV Pakistan was established in 2009 and it was a great opportunity for the Catholic Church in Pakistan to Catholic evangelization through the media among the community of Pakistan. The Founder and Executive Director, Fr. Morris Jalal OFM Cap took the initiative to record community spiritual life and religious events for the promotion of the Catholic faith during his pastoral care work in St. Francis Parish, Kot Lakhpat Parish of Archdiocese of Lahore.  Catholic TV Pakistan was endorsed by Archbishop Lawrence John Saldanha, president of the National Center for Social Communication, and also inaugurated cable TV in 2009 

Initially, this TV channel was broadcast as a Cable TV from Kot Lakhpat, which expanded to different Christian settlements like Youhanabad, Model Colony, Nishat Colony, Gulberg, Nasirabad, Basti Sadian Shaw, Fazlia Colony of Lahore. It was also broadcast from Francisabad – Gujranwala, Mariamabad, Madina Town – Faisalabad, Khushpur, and Larkana, Sindh. The whole venture was administrated and supervised by Fr. Morris Jalal OFM Cap up to 2012. Mr. Jasber Ashiq assisted Fr. Morris Jalal to run the affairs of Catholic TV as program director right from the start of this TV. 

The purpose of this initiative was to utilize the modern areas of communication to promote Christian values and the good news message of the Gospel to the Holy Masses. Catholic TV Pakistan broadcast different programs, which includes Christian films, documentaries on church activities, talk shows, interviews, holy songs, rosary recitation, Bible quiz competitions, and Sunday Mass Moreover. Catholic TV also played shows on human rights abuses, current affairs, Christian personalities, and programs about the lifestyle of the clergy. Catholic TV Pakistan suspended its operation due to some unavailable circumstances. 

His Grace Archbishop Sebastian Francis Shaw, Archbishop of the Archdiocese of Lahore inaugurated Catholic TV Pakistan as the official Catholic TV channel of the Archdiocese of Lahore along with His Grace Archbishop Edgar Peña Parra (Apostolic Nuncio) and other catholic bishops of Pakistan. On the same day, His Grace Archbishop was installed as Archbishop of the Archdiocese of Lahore. 

Under the supervision of Rev. Fr. Morris Jalal OFM Cap.
The Catholic TV was started at 85-D, Model town Lahore, and all accessories were provided by His Grace Archbishop Sebastian Francis Shaw being the Chairman of Catholic TV Pakistan. The Archdiocese of Lahore is bearing all expenditures of Catholic TV since restarted of the TV in 2014. Mr. Jasber Ashiq was appointed as Director of Catholic TV along with seven team members. We have the services of about 50 volunteers, which includes fathers, sisters, catechists, and other commission members, who support us in recording and hosting programs, etc. 

Catholic TV Pakistan, now telecasting the following programs. 

•	Holy Mass
•	Rosary
•	Catholic Catechism
•	Family Life
•	Youth Talk 
•	Children Program
•	Faith & Formation
•	Social Program
•	Interfaith harmony
•	Documentaries
•	Catholic Schools and Colleges 

Rev. Fr. Morris Jalal OFM Cap was officially appointed as an Executive Director of Catholic TV Pakistan in 2017.

These programs were broadcast through Cable TV in the Archdiocese of Lahore and other dioceses of Pakistan. The office of Catholic TV has been shifted from model town to the Caritas building in the compound of the Catholic Cathedral in August 2019. 

The responsibilities of Catholic TV have been increased at the outbreak of COVID-19 and His Grace Archbishop took an initiative to telecast live Holy Masses for spiritual care and to save the lives of the faithful. 

Catholic TV is play a vital role in the promotion of the Catholic Faith through social media and YouTube channels. We have millions of followers on Facebook and YouTube.

See also
Catholic television
Catholic television channels
Catholic television networks

References

External links
 Christmas song

Catholic Church in Pakistan
Mass media in Pakistan
Urdu-language mass media
Catholic television channels
Television networks in Pakistan
Television channels and stations established in 2009
Non-profit organisations based in Pakistan
2009 establishments in Pakistan